This release was a split 10" between Mütiilation and Deathspell Omega. It was Mütiilation's third release on End All Life Productions.

Track listing
 Mütiilation – "Beyond the Decay of Time and Flies" (6:33)
 Deathspell Omega – "Insanity Supreme" (7:39)
 Deathspell Omega – "For Fire and Void Become One" (7:24)

Trivia
 The 10" LP was released in only 400 hand-numbered copies.
 Even if Mütiilation was no longer part of The Black Legions, the side of the record features their symbol.

External links
Album info on Discogs

Mütiilation albums
Deathspell Omega albums
2002 EPs
Split EPs